The Shakkar River is a tributary of the Narmada River in the state of Madhya Pradesh in central India. It meets Narmada near Gadarwara.

The Shakkar River passes through  and nearby towns are Pipariya, Bareli, Sohagpur, Gadarwara.

See also
 List of rivers of Madhya Pradesh
 List of rivers of India

References

Rivers of Madhya Pradesh
Tributaries of the Narmada River
Rivers of India